Statistics of Swedish football Division 3 for the 1999 season.

League standings

Norra Norrland 1999

Mellersta Norrland 1999

Södra Norrland 1999

Norra Svealand 1999

Östra Svealand 1999

Västra Svealand 1999

Nordöstra Götaland 1999

Nordvästra Götaland 1999

Mellersta Götaland 1999

Sydöstra Götaland 1999

Sydvästra Götaland 1999

Södra Götaland 1999

Footnotes

References 

Swedish Football Division 3 seasons
4
Sweden
Sweden